Harvey Vernon (June 30, 1927 – October 9, 1996) was an American actor from Flint, Michigan.  His birth name was Chet Smith.

Perhaps his most famous role was Jasper DeWitt in the television series Carter Country. He also appeared in motion pictures as diverse as MacArthur, Teen Wolf and Someone to Watch Over Me.

Vernon's earliest guest starring roles include appearances in The Rockford Files, The Dukes of Hazzard, Cagney & Lacey and Touched by an Angel.

In 1986 and In the 1990s, he guest starred on Highway to Heaven, The Golden Girls, Star Trek: Deep Space Nine (in the episode "Equilibrium") and in The Larry Sanders Show.

Filmography

References

External links
 

1927 births
1996 deaths
20th-century American male actors
American male film actors
American male television actors
Male actors from Michigan
Actors from Flint, Michigan